Piano Concerto No. 4 may refer to:
 Piano Concerto No. 4 (Beethoven)
 Piano Concerto No. 4 (Mozart)
 Piano Concerto No. 4 (Prokofiev)
 Piano Concerto No. 4 (Rachmaninoff)
 Piano Concerto No. 4 (Ries)
 Piano Concerto No. 4 (Rorem)
 Piano Concerto No. 4 (Rubinstein)
 Piano Concerto No. 4 (Saint-Saëns)
 Piano Concerto No. 4 (Villa-Lobos)